Freiherr Adolph Franz Friedrich Ludwig Knigge (16 October 17526 May 1796) was a German writer, Freemason, and a leading member of the Order of the Illuminati.

Knigge was born in Bredenbeck (now a part of Wennigsen, Lower Saxony) in the Electorate of Hanover as a member of the lesser nobility. When he was barely eleven, his mother died, and when his father died three years later the teenager inherited a large debt. His creditors took possession of the family property and assigned the boy a meagre pension of 500 thalers.

He studied law from 1769 to 1772 in Göttingen where he became a member of Corps Hannovera. He was allegedly initiated into Freemasonry in 1772 in Kassel, where he held a position as Court Squire (hofjunker) and Assessor of the War and Domains Exchequer.  In 1777 he became Chamberlain at the Weimar court.

In 1780 Knigge joined Adam Weishaupt's Bavarian Illuminati and his work with the Illuminati gave the group a great deal of publicity and influence of Masonic chapters. But in 1783 dissensions arose between Knigge and Weishaupt, which resulted in Knigge's final withdrawal from the group on 1 July 1784. Knigge stated that he could no longer endure Weishaupt's pedantic domineering, which frequently assumed offensive forms. He accused Weishaupt of "Jesuitism", and suspected him of being "a Jesuit in disguise" (Nachtr., I, 129). "And was I", he adds, "to labour under his banner for mankind, to lead men under the yoke of so stiff-necked a fellow?—Never!"

Knigge's involvement with the Illuminati, support of the advancement of human rights, and a period of serious illness led to the loss of support of his aristocratic sponsors and finally his fortune. Knigge found a measure of financial stability again with a position in Bremen in 1790. He died in Bremen in 1796.

In Germany, Knigge is best remembered for his book Über den Umgang mit Menschen, a treatise on the fundamental principles of human relations that has the reputation of being the authoritative guide to behaviour, politeness, and etiquette. The work is more of a sociological and philosophical treatise on the basis of human relations than a how-to guide on etiquette, but the German word “Knigge” has come to mean “good manners” or books on etiquette.

References

Works 
 Allgemeines System für das Volk zur Grundlage aller Erkenntnisse für Menschen aus allen Nationen, Ständen und Religionen (General System for the Public, Towards a Foundation of all Knowledge of People of all Nations, Conditions, and Religions), 1778
 Der Roman meines Lebens (The Story of my Life), 1781
 On the Jesuits, Freemasons, and Rosicrucians, 1781
 Sechs Predigten gegen Despotismus, Dummheit, Aberglauben, Ungerechtigkeit, Untreue und Müßiggang (Six Sermons against Despotism, Stupidity, Superstition, Injustice, Mistruth, and Idleness), 1783
 Geschichte Peter Clausens (The History of Peter Clausen), 1783–85
 Gesammelte politische und prosaische kleinere Schriften (Collected Political and Prosaic Lesser Writings), 1784
 "Essay on Freemasonry", 1784
 Contribution towards the latest history of the Order of Freemasons, 1786
 Bekenntnisse (Übersetzung des Rousseauschen Werks aus dem Französischen) (Confessions"–Translation of the Works of Rousseau from the French), 1786–90
 Die Verirrungen des Philosophen oder Geschichte Ludwigs von Seelbergs (The Errors of the Philosopher, or Story of Ludwig von Seelberg), 1787
 Philo's endliche Antwort auf verschiedene Anforderungen und Fragen, meine Verbindung mit dem Orden der Illuminaten betreffend (Philo’s Reply To Questions Concerning His Association With the Illuminati), 1788, 2012 
 Über den Umgang mit Menschen (On Human Relations), 1788
 Geschichte des armen Herrn von Mildenberg (The Story of the Poor Herr von Mildenberg), 1789
 Benjamin Noldmanns Geschichte der Aufklärung in Abyssinien (Benjamin Noldmann's History of the Enlightenment in Abyssinia), novel, 1790
 Über den Zustand des geselligen Lebens in den vereinigten Niederlanden (On the Conditions of Social Life in the United Netherlands), 1790
 Das Zauberschloß oder Geschichte des Grafen Tunger (The Enchanted Castle, or the History of Count Tunger), novel, 1791
 "Politisches Glaubensbekenntnis von Joseph Wurmbrand" ("The Political Credo of Joseph Wurmbrand"), Essay, 1792
 Die Reise nach Braunschweig, (The Journey to Brunswick), novel, 1792
 Erläuterungen über die Rechte des Menschen. Für die Deutschen (Elucidations on the Rights of Men. For the Germans), 1792
 "Über Schriftsteller und Schriftstellerey" ("Of Writers and Writing"), essay, 1793
 Geschichte des Amtsraths Guthmann (The Story of Amtsrath Guthmann), 1794
 Reise nach Fritzlar im Sommer 1794 (Journey to Fritzlar in Summer 1794), satire, 1795
 The Secret School of Wisdom: The Authentic Rituals and Doctrines of the Illuminati, edited by Josef Wäges and Reinhard Markner, London: Lewis Masonic, 2015 (contains contributions by Knigge)

External links 

 Biography of Knigge and links to several of Knigge's works online at Project Gutenberg-DE
 Full text of the first American edition (in English) by Peter Will (1805) of: "Über den Umgang mit Menschen" entitled: "Practical philosophy of social life or, The art of conversing with men", downloadable (open access) from Google books.
 Full text of Knigge's "Über den Umgang mit Menschen" (in German language) from Project Gutenberg-DE
 Some of Knigge's major works, original German texts based on late 18th century editions

1752 births
1796 deaths
18th-century German people
18th-century German writers
German non-fiction writers
Lower Saxon nobility
People from the Electorate of Hanover
People from Hanover Region
Barons of Germany
German Freemasons
German male non-fiction writers
18th-century German male writers